George Henry Bosch (18 February 1861 – 30 August 1934) was an Australian merchant and philanthropist.

Early life
Bosch was born at Osborne's Flat, near Beechworth, Victoria, the son of George Bosch, a miner from Bavaria, and his wife Emily, née Spann, of Hamburg. His mother belonged to a Dutch family, which migrated to Hamburg and became prosperous merchants. George Henry Bosch was educated at T. and C. McAlpine's private school at Richmond, a suburb of Melbourne, and was then apprenticed to a watchmaker.

Career
Bosch went to Sydney in 1881 and with his father's help, established a small watchmaker's business. He began importing watchmakers' and jewellers' supplies, and about 1884 joined forces with Emil Barthel, who had a similar business, under the name of Bosch, Barthel and Company. The importing of dental and opticians' supplies was added in 1885, and the business became the largest of its kind in Australia. In 1894 Bosch bought Barthel's interest in the business, which continued to progress and expand with branches in Melbourne and Brisbane.

Working very hard and living simply, Bosch became very wealthy, and he quietly gave away considerable sums of money. His first public gift was a large donation to the Dreadnought Fund in 1909. He had a breakdown in 1915 due to overwork, and henceforth had to go more quietly. In 1924 he gave a sum of £1000 to the University of Sydney for research on paralysis; his mother was a partial cripple. This was followed in 1925 by £2000 for cancer research, and in 1928 £27,000 was given to establish a chair in histology and embryology, and £1500 for the purchase of apparatus for the anatomy department. In October 1929, £220,000 in city properties and securities was transferred to the university to establish full-time chairs in medicine, surgery and bacteriology, and for the building and equipping of laboratories or the promotion of medical and surgical knowledge. Another large donation was £10,000 to Trinity Grammar School (New South Wales), and he contributed largely to the upkeep of the Millewa boys' home and the Windsor boys' farm. Though he practically retired in 1924, he had another breakdown in 1928, but after a long holiday in the east, he came back in much improved health. In July 1932 the university received a further sum of £6000.

Death and legacy
Bosch died at Sydney on 30 August 1934. He had married Gwendoline Jupp in 1929, who had nursed him through an illness. She survived him with two sons. After providing for legacies and a life interest for his widow, further substantial benefits will eventually accrue to the University of Sydney. A portrait of Bosch by George Washington Lambert is in the great hall at the university, and there is a memorial window at St John's Church, Gordon, Sydney.

Bosch was a keen business man, whose only recreation was walking until he took up golf in middle life; he was honorary treasurer of Manly Golf Club for many years. He looked upon his wealth as a responsibility and gave much thought to his benefactions, his chief desire being that he might alleviate human suffering.

References

1861 births
1934 deaths
19th-century Australian philanthropists
People from Beechworth
20th-century Australian philanthropists